Marshall Miller is an Australian former rugby league footballer who played for the North Queensland Cowboys in the 1990s. He primarily played .

Playing career
A Mackay junior, Miller represented the Queensland under-19 side, starting on the wing, before joining the North Queensland Cowboys in 1996. In Round 15 of the 1996 ARL season, he made his first grade debut in the Cowboys' 32–40 loss to the Western Suburbs Magpies, starting on the wing and scoring two tries. In his rookie season, he played six games, scoring four tries. In 1997, he played just one game for the Cowboys.

After leaving the Cowboys, he returned to Mackay, playing for the Wests Tigers. He was named the club's Player of the Year three times (1998, 2000 and 2008) and played over 100 games for the club.

Statistics

ARL/Super League
 Statistics are correct to the end of the 1997 season

References

Living people
Australian rugby league players
Indigenous Australian rugby league players
North Queensland Cowboys players
Rugby league wingers
Year of birth missing (living people)